Indu Mitha (née Chatterjee) (born 1929) is a Pakistani exponent of Bharatnatyam and one of only two in the nation (the other being Sheema Kirmani). She is also a faculty member at the Rawalpindi campus of the National College of the Arts.

Personal life
Indu Mitha was born in Lahore in 1929 as Indu Chatterjee, into a Bengali Christian family of Brahmin heritage that had converted to Christianity. She studied MA philosophy from Delhi University in 1951. Her father, Gyanesh Chandra Chatterji, was a professor of philosophy and president of the Government College in Lahore, which was where Mitha grew up. Her elder sister Uma Anand married famous Bollywood director Chetan Anand. Her family moved to Delhi from Lahore during the Partition of India. In Delhi, she learned Bharatanatyam from Vijay Raghava Rao and Shrimati Lalita. Mitha learnt modern expressional dance from the iconic choreographer and actress Zohra Sehgal. After Independence, Mitha continued her dance training at Sangeet Bharat School and then later from S.V.Lalita.

In 1951, she married Captain Aboobaker Osman Mitha, a Mumbai Memon against the wishes of her family, and moved back to Pakistan with him. Their daughter, Tehreema Mitha is an accomplished Bharatnatyam dancer.

Career
In the years following her husband's retirement, Mitha began teaching Bharatnatyam in Lahore. Her first position was at the Lahore Grammar school, where she became a celebrated dance teacher. Her students and her were even able to put on a full-on performance at the end of her first teaching sojourn.

Her early performances were at private all-women parties, military functions, and Red Cross charity shows or in front of the All Pakistan Women's Association. She now does one show a year for private audiences, mostly all-women groups, due to the heightened atmosphere linked to the rise of the Taliban.

Mitha ran an academy/school "Mazmoon e Shauq" to teach classical dance where she taught many students like Amna Mawaz Khan.

Adaptations
To suit Pakistani cultural norms, Mitha has altered the performance and style of the Bharatnatyam she teaches. She has composed Bharatnatyam songs in Urdu, due to her lack of understanding of Tamil, Telugu or Sanskrit, the three languages Bharatnatyam songs are traditionally composed in.

Awards
Mitha received President’s Award for Pride of Performance Awards (2020–2029) in August, 2020.

Notes

References

1929 births
Living people
Bengali women artists
Pakistani Christians
People from Lahore
Pakistani choreographers
Pakistani female dancers
Pakistani music educators
Dance teachers
Pakistani people of Bengali descent
Bharatanatyam exponents
20th-century women artists
20th-century dancers
Women music educators
Teachers of Indian classical dance
Recipients of the Pride of Performance
Indian emigrants to Pakistan